The 2011 Hong Kong Super Series was a top level badminton competition contested from November 15, 2011 to November 20, 2011 in Hong Kong. It was the eleventh BWF Super Series competition on the 2011 BWF Super Series schedule. A total of $250,000 was given out as prize money.

Men's singles

Seeds

  Lee Chong Wei
  Chen Long
  Lin Dan
  Peter Gade
  Chen Jin
  Sho Sasaki
  Du Pengyu
  Marc Zwiebler

Top half

Bottom half

Finals

Women's singles

Seeds

  Wang Yihan
  Wang Shixian
  Wang Xin
  Saina Nehwal
  Jiang Yanjiao
  Juliane Schenk
  Tine Baun
  Cheng Shao-chieh

Top half

Bottom half

Finals

Men's doubles

Seeds

  Cai Yun / Fu Haifeng
  Jung Jae-sung / Lee Yong-dae
  Mathias Boe / Carsten Mogensen
  Ko Sung-hyun / Yoo Yeon-seong
  Koo Kien Keat / Tan Boon Heong
  Chai Biao / Guo Zhendong
  Hendra Aprida Gunawan / Alvent Yulianto
  Hirokatsu Hashimoto / Noriyasu Hirata

Top half

Bottom half

Finals

Women's doubles

Seeds

  Wang Xiaoli / Yu Yang
  Tian Qing / Zhao Yunlei
  Mizuki Fujii / Reika Kakiiwa
  Ha Jung-eun / Kim Min-jung
  Cheng Wen-hsing / Chien Yu-chin
  Miyuki Maeda / Satoko Suetsuna
  Shizuka Matsuo / Mami Naito
  Christinna Pedersen / Kamilla Rytter Juhl

Top half

Bottom half

Finals

Mixed doubles

Seeds

  Zhang Nan / Zhao Yunlei
  Xu Chen / Ma Jin
  Joachim Fischer Nielsen / Christinna Pedersen
  Chen Hung-ling / Cheng Wen-hsing
  Michael Fuchs / Birgit Michels
  Chris Adcock /  Imogen Bankier
  Robert Mateusiak / Nadieżda Zięba
  Shintaro Ikeda / Reiko Shiota

Top half

Bottom half

Finals

References

External links
tournamentsoftware.com

Hong Kong
Super Series
Hong Kong Open (badminton)